The UI GreenMetric World University Ranking is an initiative of Universitas Indonesia which is being launched in 2010. As part of its strategy of raising its international standing, the University hosted an International Conference on World University Rankings on 16 April 2009. It invited a number of experts on world university rankings such as Isidro Aguillo (Webometrics), Angela Yung-Chi Hou (HEEACT), and Alex Usher (Educational Policy Canada). It was clear from the discussions that current criteria being used to rank universities were not giving credit to those that were making efforts to reduce their carbon footprint and thus help combat global climate change. UI GreenMetric founders were aware that a number of top world universities, for example Harvard, Chicago, Copenhagen have been taking steps to manage and improve their sustainability. There are also cooperative efforts among groups of universities. A grading system which includes information on sustainability at 300 universities exists under the title the United States Green Report Card. This is excellent, however, results are given in terms of a grade (A to F) rather than a ranking and the number of universities included is relatively circumscribed. UI GreenMetric founders saw the need for a uniform system that would be suitable to attract the support of thousands of the world’s universities and where the results were based on a numerical score that would allow ranking so that quick comparisons could be made among them on the criteria of their commitment to addressing the problems of sustainability and environmental impact.

Methodology and criteria 
Universities are asked annually between May and October to participate by filling a survey with questions about their sustainability performance. Many questions in this survey also demand uploading evidence documents to avoid cheating. The results are published in December.

Since 2014, participating universities are ranked according to the following six criteria. The points per indicator are given in brackets.

Participants 
During the first ranking in 2010, 96 universities participated. The University of California, Berkeley came in first place. Since the 2010 edition, the number of participating universities grew to 956 in 2021.

Services 
In 2021, UI GreenMetric introduce new services to continue our global work in supporting sustainable universities. These new services are Consulting, Rankings Tracker, Trees Rating, Events, and Branding.

 Consulting: End-to-end services designed to cultivate excellence in sustainability.
 Rankings Tracker: Detailed evaluation of university’s performance in UI GreenMetric Rankings.
 Trees Rating: Comprehensive audit to evaluate university achievement in sustainability.
 Events: Unique opportunities to explore the latest trends with key members of the sustainability ecosystem.
 Branding: Enhance your university visibility on UI GreenMetric website and social media.

Beneficiaries for Service Users 

 Shaping the development of more than 417 billion square meters of university area
 Contributing to reduce carbon footprint of more than 7 billion metric tons per year from daily university activities
 Implementing Partnership for the goals (SDGs number 17)
 Promoting your university to more than 956 Universities from 80 Countries
 Getting in-depth insight to your university performances and alternative solutions in UI GreenMetric

Types of Services 
 Silver: Profile and Banner, Hosting Event
 Gold: Profile and Banner, Hosting Event, Fact File Analysis, Consultation Meeting (2), Certificate of Compliance 
 Platinum: Profile and Banner, Hosting Event, Fact File Analysis, Consultation Meeting (3), Certificate of Compliance, Certificate of Trees Rating

References 

University of Indonesia